The City Stands Trial is a 1952 Italian crime drama film directed by Luigi Zampa and starring Amedeo Nazzari, Silvana Pampanini and Paolo Stoppa. It is based on a revisiting of the Cuocolo murders and the struggle for control of Naples by the Camorra in the early 1900s. It is considered to be Zampa's most accomplished film. It was shot at the Cinecittà Studios in Rome and on location in Naples. It was entered into the 3rd Berlin International Film Festival.

Synopsis
In Naples at the beginning of the twentieth century a double murder of husband and wife appears to be the work of the Camorra. A crusading young judge takes on the case but faces a number of threats and obstacles, and his investigation turns much of the population against him.

Cast

 Amedeo Nazzari as Judge Spicacci
 Silvana Pampanini as Liliana Ferrari
 Paolo Stoppa as Perrone
 Dante Maggio as Armando Capezzuto
 Franco Interlenghi as Luigi Esposito
 Irène Galter as Nunziata
 Gualtiero Tumiati as Consigliere Capo
 Rino Genovese as Mimì
 Eduardo Ciannelli as Alfonso Navona 
 Tina Pica as Restaurant's cook
 Turi Pandolfini as Don Filippetti
 Mariella Lotti as Elena  
 Franca Tamantini as 	Carmela
 Bella Starace Sainati as 	The Porter at Ruotolo's
 Agostino Salvietti as 	Brigadiere Mastellone
 Mimì Ferrari as 	Don Salvatore
 Viviane Vallé as 	Maria
 Vittorio André as Amedeo Contursi
 Tina Castigliano as 	Amalia Tortorella 
 Vittoria Crispo as Neighbour of Ruotolos
 Lino Crispo as Gennarino 'nzisto
 Vittoria Donato as Adelina Leonardi
 Mario Laurentino as The Jeweller De Nicola
 Arturo Maghizzano as 	Mezarecchia
 Pasquale Martino as 	Brigadiere Luigi Cifariello
 Mario Passante as 	The Man Whom Filippetti Hands Ledgers
 Nino Veglia as Maria's Pimp
 Nino Vingelli as 	Pasqualino 'o 17
 Carlo Pisacane as 	Don Rosario
 Ada Colangeli as The Maid at Tortorella's
 Ugo D'Alessio as 	Gennaro Ruotolo

References

Bibliography
 Moliterno, Gino (2008). The A to Z of Italian Cinema, Plymouth: Scarecrow Press

External links

1952 films
1950s Italian-language films
1952 drama films
1952 crime films
Italian crime films
1950s historical films
Italian historical films
Films set in Naples
Italian black-and-white films
Films about the Camorra
Films directed by Luigi Zampa
Films with screenplays by Suso Cecchi d'Amico
Italian drama films
1950s Italian films
Films shot at Cinecittà Studios
Films shot in Naples
Films set in the 1900s